The 1840 United States presidential election in Ohio took place between October 30 and December 2, 1840, as part of the 1840 United States presidential election. Voters chose 21 representatives, or electors to the Electoral College, who voted for President and Vice President.

Ohio voted for the Whig candidate, William Henry Harrison, over Democratic candidate Martin Van Buren. Harrison won Ohio by a margin of 8.53%. Ohio was the home state of William Henry Harrison, Harrison improved his margin of victory from the last election over Van Buren by +4.22%

Results

See also
 United States presidential elections in Ohio

References

Ohio
1840
1840 Ohio elections